Saint Paul's Episcopal Church is a historic church building at 308 N. Monroe in Waxahachie, Texas.

The Gothic Revival church building was constructed in 1885 and added to the National Register of Historic Places in 1986.

See also

National Register of Historic Places listings in Ellis County, Texas
Recorded Texas Historic Landmarks in Ellis County

References

External links

Episcopal churches in Texas
Churches on the National Register of Historic Places in Texas
Carpenter Gothic church buildings in Texas
Churches completed in 1885
19th-century Episcopal church buildings
Churches in Ellis County, Texas
National Register of Historic Places in Ellis County, Texas